Montana Highway 3 (MT 3) is a highway in central Montana extending north from Billings to Great Falls.

Route description
At its southern end, MT 3 begins at I-90 in Billings and travels northwest  to US 12 near Lavina – this is the only section of MT 3 that is not concurrent with a US highway. At Eddie's Corner, MT 3 turns west, leaving US 191 and joining the US 87 / MT 200 concurrency, and travels west  to Armington where US 89 joins the highway. The four highways continue  to Great Falls, where it follows a  concurrency with I-315 and ends at I-15.

MT 3 is part of the Camino Real Corridor (Corridor 27), a High Priority Corridor that connects El Paso, Texas to the Canada–US border at Sweet Grass, Montana. The corridor is anchored by Interstate 25 and is part of the larger Ports-to-Plains Alliance. MT 3 is connected to the Canadian border via I-15, and is connected to I-25 in Buffalo, Wyoming via I-90.

Major intersections

References

003
Transportation in Yellowstone County, Montana
Transportation in Golden Valley County, Montana
Transportation in Wheatland County, Montana
Transportation in Fergus County, Montana
Transportation in Judith Basin County, Montana
Transportation in Cascade County, Montana